Cinnamomum elegans is a species of plants belonging to the laurel family, Lauraceae, found in Samoa.

References

External links 

 
 Cinnamomum elegans at Tropicos.org

elegans
Flora of Samoa
Plants described in 1898